The World Is Flat is a 2005 book written by Thomas Friedman.

The World Is Flat may also refer to:
The World Is Flat (album), 2002 album by The Montgolfier Brothers
 "The World Is Flat" (song), 1997 song by Echobelly

See also
Flat Earth (disambiguation)